Mini World was an English-language Japanese magazine which ran from 1988 to 2001. The magazine had a vocabulary level of 2,000 words, equivalent to English standards of the third year of Middle School in Japan.

References

1988 establishments in Japan
2001 disestablishments in Japan
Defunct magazines published in Japan
Education magazines
English-language magazines
Magazines established in 1988
Magazines disestablished in 2001